Arnt Simensen (7 September 1899 – 10 January 1947) was a Norwegian footballer. He played in seven matches for the Norway national football team from 1921 to 1923.

References

External links
 

1899 births
1947 deaths
Norwegian footballers
Norway international footballers
Place of birth missing
Association footballers not categorized by position